First-seeded Helen Wills defeated Lilí de Álvarez 6–2, 6–4 to win the ladies' singles tennis title at the 1927 Wimbledon Championships.

Kitty Godfree was the defending champion, but lost to Elizabeth Ryan in the quarterfinals.

Seeds

  Helen Wills (champion)
  Kitty Godfree (quarterfinals)
  Kea Bouman (fourth round)
  Lili de Álvarez (final) 
  Elizabeth Ryan (semifinals)
  Molla Mallory (third round)
  Bobbie Heine (third round)
  Irene Peacock (quarterfinals)

Draw

Finals

Top half

Section 1

Section 2

Section 3

Section 4

Bottom half

Section 5

Section 6

Section 7

Section 8

References

External links

Women's Singles
Wimbledon Championship by year – Women's singles
Wimbledon Championships - singles
Wimbledon Championships - singles